Mehdi Kiani may refer to:

 Mehdi Kiani (footballer, born 1987), Iranian footballer
 Mehdi Kiani (footballer, born 1978), Iranian footballer